The Cotter's Saturday Night is a poem by Robert Burns that was first published in Poems, Chiefly in the Scottish Dialect in 1786.

Composition
Burns wrote "The Cotter's Saturday Night" at his Mossgiel farm, near Mauchline, during the winter of 1785-86. He adopted the lengthy Spenserian stanza form from Robert Fergusson's similarly themed 1773 poem "The Farmer's Ingle" to allow space to evoke his pastoral scene. An extract from another major influence, Thomas Gray's "Elegy Written in a Country Churchyard", is used as an epigraph. The poem is dedicated to Robert Aiken, a successful Ayrshire lawyer who was Burns's patron at the time, and the opening stanza addresses him in advancing the poem's sentimental theme.

Summary
On a cold Saturday evening in November, a Scottish cotter—a peasant farmer who labours in return for the right to live in a cottage—returns home to his family ahead of the Sabbath. His wife and numerous children gather round the fire to share their news, while he gives out fatherly advice and admonition based on Christian teachings.

A boy from a neighbouring farm comes to call on the cotter's oldest daughter. The cotter's wife is pleased to see that the boy is not a rake and truly loves her daughter, and the cotter welcomes him into his home. The family then eat supper, after which they gather round the fire again as the cotter reads aloud from the Bible and the family sing hymns—Burns compares the family's humble devotions favourably with "Religion's pride"—before the oldest children return to their homes and the rest of the family go to bed. The poem concludes by eulogising the morality of such family life and how it does credit to Scotland.

Legacy

"The Cotter's Saturday Night" has inspired numerous works of art and literature. The Scottish painter John Faed produced a series of illustrations featuring scenes from the poem, some of which were subsequently engraved by William Miller. Scenes from the poem also inspired paintings by David Wilkie and William Kidd, and William Allan's painting of Burns writing the poem was subsequently engraved by John Burnet.

Bas-relief panels featuring scenes from the poem adorn a number of statues of Robert Burns, including: George Edwin Ewing's statue in George Square, Glasgow; Charles Calverley's statue in Washington Park, Albany, New York; and George Anderson Lawson's statue in Victoria Park, Halifax, Nova Scotia.

The title of the Booker Prize-nominated novel From Scenes Like These by Gordon Williams ironically quotes the opening line of the poem's nineteenth stanza.

References

1786 poems
Poetry by Robert Burns
Scots-language works